Emily Keene, Cherifa of Wazan or Ouzzane of Morocco (1849–1944) was a British expatriate, adventurer and travelogue. She went to Morocco in 1871 as a governess and fell in love with the Sharif of Ouzzane, a powerful regional governor in Morocco  She married the Sharif of Ouzzane in 1873 even though there was strong opposition from both families. This was one of the first widely known cases of interracial marriage between a British expatriate and a Moroccan. 

She was an important figure bringing vaccination to the region. 

She bore two sons, one of which succeeded his father as the Sharif of Ouzzane.  

She eventually divorced the Sharif after the finding out of an extramarital affair. The Sharif died in 1891. Keene's son Moulay Ali ben Abdeslam then became Sharif of the region. He served as an officer in the French Army.  

She was a prolific writer and notetaker of her daily life, which was collected and published under the title My Life Story published in 1912. 

She died in 1944 in Tangier.

References

External links 

 My Life Story (1912), accessible online

1849 births
1944 deaths
British expatriates in Morocco
19th-century British writers
19th-century British women writers
British governesses
People from Tangier
19th-century memoirists